Piercey may refer to:

 Nick Piercey, British radio personality
 Piercey Islands, Nunavut, Canada

See also
Piercy (disambiguation)